A skyspace is an architectural design in which a room, which is painted in a neutral color has a large hole in its ceiling which opens directly to the sky. The room, whose perimeter has benches, allows observers to look at the sky in such a way as though it were framed. LED lights which surround the hole can change colors to affect the viewer's perception of the sky.

The design is the work of American artist James Turrell. As of 2013 over 82 skyspaces have been installed worldwide. Examples include Dividing the Light at Pomona College, the Skyspace Lech in Vorarlberg (Austria), the Live Oak Friends Meeting in Houston, Texas and at Rice University, also in Houston.

Photo gallery

References

External links
"Skyspace: Dividing the Light" (2007)
JamesTurrell.com Skyspace section: includes photographs and locations of Turrell Skyspaces around the world

Architectural design
Works by James Turrell